Niederhasli railway station is a railway station in the Swiss canton of Zurich. It is situated in the municipality of Niederhasli on the Wehntal line. The station is served by Zurich S-Bahn line S15.

Services 
The following services stop at Dielsdorf:

References

External links 
 
 

Railway stations in the canton of Zürich
Swiss Federal Railways stations